Morgan County is a county located in the U.S. state of Ohio. As of the 2020 census, the population was 13,802, making it the third-least populous county in Ohio. Its county seat is McConnelsville. The county was created in 1817 and later organized in 1819. It is named for Daniel Morgan, an officer in the American Revolutionary War.

History
Morgan County was formed on December 29, 1817, from portions of Guernsey, Muskingum and Washington counties. It was named after Daniel Morgan, a member in the Congress from Virginia, and general in the American Revolutionary War.

Geography

Adjacent counties
 Muskingum County (north)
 Noble County (northeast)
 Washington County (southeast)
 Athens County (southwest)
 Perry County (west)

Public areas
 Wayne National Forest
 Burr Oak State Park

Demographics

2000 census
As of the census of 2000, there were 14,897 people, 5,890 households, and 4,176 families living in the county. The population density was 36 people per square mile (14/km2). There were 7,771 housing units at an average density of 19 per square mile (7/km2). The racial makeup of the county was 93.66% White, 3.41% Black or African American, 0.35% Native American, 0.08% Asian, 0.26% from other races, and 2.24% from two or more races. 0.41% of the population were Hispanic or Latino of any race.

There were 5,890 households, out of which 30.90% had children under the age of 18 living with them, 56.90% were married couples living together, 9.90% had a female householder with no husband present, and 29.10% were non-families. 25.50% of all households were made up of individuals, and 12.00% had someone living alone who was 65 years of age or older. The average household size was 2.50 and the average family size was 2.98.

In the county, the population was spread out, with 25.30% under the age of 18, 7.80% from 18 to 24, 26.30% from 25 to 44, 25.00% from 45 to 64, and 15.60% who were 65 years of age or older. The median age was 39 years. For every 100 females there were 96.50 males. For every 100 females age 18 and over, there were 94.90 males.

The median income for a household in the county was $28,868, and the median income for a family was $34,973. Males had a median income of $30,411 versus $21,039 for females. The per capita income for the county was $13,967. About 15.70% of families and 18.40% of the population were below the poverty line, including 25.10% of those under age 18 and 12.40% of those age 65 or over.

2010 census
As of the 2010 United States census, there were 15,054 people, 6,034 households, and 4,140 families living in the county. The racial makeup of the county was 93.2% white, 2.9% black or African American, 0.3% American Indian, 0.1% Asian, 0.2% from other races, and 3.3% from two or more races. Those of Hispanic or Latino origin made up 0.6% of the population. In terms of ancestry, 21.2% were German, 12.9% were English, 12.7% were Irish, and 9.8% were American.

Of the 6,034 households, 29.7% had children under the age of 18 living with them, 53.4% were married couples living together, 10.4% had a female householder with no husband present, 31.4% were non-families, and 26.3% of all households were made up of individuals. The average household size was 2.46 and the average family size was 2.94. The median age was 42.4 years.

The median income for a household in the county was $34,962 and the median income for a family was $40,440. Males had a median income of $37,173 versus $30,176 for females. The per capita income for the county was $18,777. About 15.7% of families and 19.1% of the population were below the poverty line, including 25.2% of those under age 18 and 12.6% of those age 65 or over.

Politics
Morgan County is a stronghold Republican county in presidential elections. The only Democratic presidential candidates to win the county were Woodrow Wilson in 1912 and Lyndon B. Johnson in 1964, but Bill Clinton came within 181 votes of carrying it in 1996.

|}

Communities

Villages
 Chesterhill
 Malta
 McConnelsville (county seat)
 Stockport

Townships

 Bloom
 Bristol
 Center
 Deerfield
 Homer
 Malta
 Manchester
 Marion
 Meigsville
 Morgan
 Penn
 Union
 Windsor
 York

Census-designated place
 Rose Farm

Unincorporated communities

 Bishopville
 Bristol
 Deavertown
 Eagleport
 Hooksburg
 Joy
 Morganville
 Moscow Mills
 Pennsville
 Plantsville
 Reinersville
 Ringgold
 Rokeby Lock
 Rosseau
 Roxbury
 Todds
 Triadelphia
 Unionville

See also
 National Register of Historic Places listings in Morgan County, Ohio

References

Further reading
 Thomas William Lewis, History of Southeastern Ohio and the Muskingum Valley, 1788-1928. In Three Volumes. Chicago: S.J. Clarke Publishing Co., 1928.

External links
 Official website
 Morgan County Library website
 The Morgan County Ohio Historical Society
 Morgan County Ohio Chamber Of Commerce

 
Appalachian Ohio
Counties of Appalachia
1817 establishments in Ohio
Populated places established in 1817